Bimane is a heterocyclic chemical compound.  Bimane forms the core of a class of fluorescent dyes known as bimane dyes.

Fluorescent dyes